The 2006 NCAA Division III baseball tournament was played at the end of the 2006 NCAA Division III baseball season to determine the 31st national champion of college baseball at the NCAA Division III level. The tournament concluded with eight teams competing at Fox Cities Stadium in Grand Chute, Wisconsin for the championship. Eight regional tournaments were held to determine the participants in the World Series. Regional tournaments were contested in double-elimination format, with three regions consisting of six teams and five consisting of seven, for a total of 53 teams participating in the tournament, up from 42 in 2005.

Bids
The 53 competing teams were:

Regionals

West Regional
W.O. Hart Field-Orange, CA (Host: Chapman University)

New York Regional
Leo Pinckney Field at Falcon Park-Auburn, NY (Host: Ithaca College)

South Regional
Bauer Field-Rocky Mount, NC (Host: North Carolina Wesleyan College)

New England Regional
Whitehouse Field-Harwich, MA (Host: Eastern College Athletic Conference)

Mid-Atlantic Regional
Boyertown Bear Stadium-Boyertown, PA (Host: Alvernia University)

Central Regional
Kelly Field at Irv Utz Stadium-St. Louis, MO (Host: Washington University in St. Louis)

Midwest Regional
Witter Field-Wisconsin Rapids, WI (Host: University of Wisconsin-Stevens Point)

Mideast Regional
Art Nehf Field-Terre Haute, IN (Host: Rose-Hulman Institute of Technology)

World Series
Fox Cities Stadium-Grand Chute, WI (Host: University of Wisconsin-Oshkosh/Lawrence University)

References

NCAA Division III Baseball Tournament
Tournament